SunLink Corporation is a privately owned company headquartered in Mill Valley, California, which designs, manufactures and delivers renewable energy solutions including: tracker, fixed-tilt and roof photovoltaic mounting systems for commercial and utility-scale installations; solar project installation and O&M services; and project intelligence software that offers energy project analytics and remote energy asset controls (SCADA).

SunLink's Warehouse and Training Center is located in San Leandro, California. Product design, testing and some fabrication take place in California. Manufacturing is done in the United States and China.

The company does R&D work in the areas of seismic and wind engineering. Partners include the Boundary Layer Laboratory at the University of Western Ontario and structural engineering firm Rutherford & Chekene SunLink also conducted extensive seismic testing for two of its roof mount systems at UC Berkeley’s Pacific Earthquake Engineering Research Center Shake Table

Founded in 2004, SunLink solutions have been installed at more than 120,000 commercial and utility-scale installations throughout the Americas.

References 

Photovoltaics manufacturers
Manufacturing companies based in California
Solar energy companies of the United States
Companies based in San Rafael, California
Energy companies established in 2004
Renewable resource companies established in 2004
Manufacturing companies established in 2004
American companies established in 2004